Carmel & District Cricket Club is a team based in Flintshire North Wales who play competitive cricket in the North Wales Cricket League. They are the only Welsh village team to have defeated an international cricket team, and have staged several matches between national teams at their Pen-y-Gelli ground.

Carmel was founded as the result of a public meeting for those interested in the formation of a cricket club held at Carmel Village Hall in September 1965. The main people behind the meeting were Norman Cross-Parry, Meirion Griffith and Bill Parker.

The club initially played their matches at the Golch ground, opposite the Halfway House pub on the old A55 road, now the A5026, in the village of Carmel between Lloc and Holywell.

The club's first ever match took place against a now defunct team made of workers from BJ Construction. The inaugural season also saw matches against the likes of Abergele, St Asaph and Northop Hall.

Eventually the Golch site was up for sale and the club successfully applied to the Sports Council and Delyn Borough Council for grant-aid to re-establish the club on another ground.

The one chosen for the new ground was a large  site with good quality soil for a cricket square located some two miles (3 km) away from the existing ground. Carmel proudly began their first season at their new Pen-y-Gelli ground in 1991 and Conwy CC provided the opponents in the inaugural match. Backed by ambitious club secretary Stan Taylor Carmel continued to develop their facilities at the ground and in July 1998 former England cricket international Tom Cartwright and Mrs Dorothy Taylor opened the new pavilion.

Carmel have also made recent forays into international cricket, which began with the Iron Curtain Cricket Tour in 2007 under the captaincy of Timothy Abraham, who had been inspired by the Harry Thompson book Penguins Stopped Play. The touring side played Estonia in Tallinn and Latvia in Riga. Carmel defeated Estonia in the final of the Helsinki Sixes tournament in Finland but lost twice in longer matches against the team.

But it was a match against Russia in the Russian National Baseball Stadium in Moscow which was the highlight of the tour where they became the first touring side to ever visit the city.

In June 2008 the Carmel Touring XI again went overseas for the 'Ottoman Empire Tour' where they defeated Romania in Bucharest and the Bulgaria in Sofia. Carmel also represented 'Wales' in the Vienna World Cup Sixes competition where they were beaten in the semi-finals by an Austrian-Pakistan team.

July 2008 saw Carmel stage their biggest project yet with the establishing of an eight-team European Twenty20 Championship tournament which featured Estonia and Russia following the club's trip to the two countries the previous summer.  Also involved were the national teams of Slovakia, Croatia, Czech Republic and a Poland as well as a Cricket Board of Wales representative side.

The tournament, which was supported by the International Cricket Council, was won by Estonia who beat Czech Republic in a dramatic last-over victory. Carmel staged the European Twenty20 tournament again in July 2009 and the national cricket teams of Croatia, Hungary, Bulgaria, Russia as well as the Island of Alderney were among those to take part.

The tournament was won by a team which represented the Flanders region after they defeated hosts Carmel in a lowscoring final. Croatia won the 'plate' competition after they defeated English club side New Victoria who had replaced Estonia after they pulled out of the event. In the week preceding the EuroTwenty20 Carmel faced prestigious touring side Crusaders Australia led by Swan Richards.

Carmel's Touring XI undertook their most ambitious tour in May and June 2009 where they played in six countries in 11 days. After victory at the Lille Twenty20 tournament in France the team recorded victories over Slovakia in Hajske and over the Hungary in Budapest.

One of the biggest honours to date for the club's touring side came later in the trip when they played the first ever international cricket match in Serbia where they ran out winners in a 40-over contest against a Belgrade Cricket Association XI. Carmel subsequently played the first international match in Macedonia when they took on a Macedonian XI in Skopje. The first of two Twenty20 clashes between the two sides was broadcast live in its entirety on national television station Sky Net.

Carmel's Touring XI toured Austria, Slovenia and Croatia in 2010, Poland, Lithuania and Latvia in 2012, Romania and Switzerland in 2013. In 2014 they played the first ever game of cricket in Montenegro against Porto Montenegro Cricket Club as well as returning to Austria, Slovenia and Austria.

On 8 October 2009 the club lost Peter Ferguson, who died from cancer. Ferguson made 1,169 appearances and scored 12,000 runs and took 1,443 wickets.

In January 2010 the club staged an international 'Snow cricket' match at the club's Pen-y-Gelli between the club's English and Welsh players. The match ended in a tie. The club are also the first team in the North Wales Cricket League to embrace both the use of social networking sites Facebook and Twitter

Carmel's First XI captain for the 2015 season is Barry Mcgauty, Second XI skipper is Christopher Jones and Third XI captain is Nick Hughes.

References

External links
Carmel & District CC website
Carmel % District CC play-cricket website

Welsh club cricket teams
1965 establishments in Wales
Sport in Flintshire